George W. Rayfield (born 1936) is an American physicist and a professor emeritus of the University of Oregon.

Early life and education 
The son of George and Hazel (née Wilson) Rayfield, George William Rayfield was born in San Francisco in 1936. In 1958 Rayfield finished a B.S. at Stanford; he earned both an M.S and a Ph.D. in 1964 at the University of California, Berkeley, advised by Frederick Reif, with the dissertation, Quantized vortex rings in superfluid helium.

Career 
In 1967, Rayfield joined the faculty of the University of Oregon as an assistant professor, and was promoted in 1968 to associate professor, specializing in the "application of biological materials to electronic devices". He was awarded professor emeritus status in 1999.

Publications

Articles

Patents

Awards, honors 
Rayfield was named a Fellow in the American Physical Society in 1995, after being nominated by the Division of Biological Physics. Rayfield was cited for "definitive experimental proof for quantized vortex rings in superfluid helium; for high precision studies on phase transitions in monolayers; for extensive studies on the optical and electrical properties of bacteriorhodopsin, and ensuing device applications."

References 

Fellows of the American Physical Society
American physicists
Living people
1936 births